Kildare may refer to:

Places

Australia
 Kildare, Victoria, Australia, now known as Geelong West

Canada
 Kildare (Edmonton), a residential neighbourhood in Edmonton, Canada
 Kildare Township in Quebec, see Saint-Ambroise-de-Kildare and Sainte-Marcelline-de-Kildare
 Kildare Capes, Prince Edward Island, a settlement on Prince Edward Island

Ireland
 County Kildare, an administrative region in the east of the Republic of Ireland
 Kildare, the town from which the county name is derived
 Kildare railway station, the railway station in Kildare, County Kildare, Ireland
 History of County Kildare, a history of the county
 Kildare Abbey

United States
 Kildare, Oklahoma, United States
 Kildare, Texas, United States, an unincorporated community
 Kildare, Wisconsin, United States

Irish constituencies
The county of Kildare in Ireland has been represented by several parliamentary constituencies:

Parliament of Ireland, to 1800
 Athy (Parliament of Ireland constituency) (1614–1800)
 Harristown (Parliament of Ireland constituency) (1684–1800)
 Kildare Borough (Parliament of Ireland constituency) (????–1800)
 Kildare County (Parliament of Ireland constituency) (????–1800)
 Naas (Parliament of Ireland constituency) (1570–1800)

House of Commons of the United Kingdom, (1801–1922) and First Dáil (1918)
 Kildare (UK Parliament constituency) (1801–1885)
 North Kildare (UK Parliament constituency) (1885–1922)
 South Kildare (UK Parliament constituency) (1885–1922)

Dáil Éireann (since 1918)
 Kildare–Wicklow (Dáil constituency) (1921–1923)
 Kildare (Dáil constituency) (1923–1937)
 Kildare (Dáil constituency) (1948–1997)
 Kildare North (Dáil constituency)  (1997–)
 Kildare South (Dáil constituency) (1997–)

People
 Brigid of Kildare, an Irish saint also known as Saint Brigid
 D. Kildare, an American poet
 Owen Kildare (1864–1911), an American writer
 Earl of Kildare, an Irish peerage title since 1316 
 Kildare Dobbs, a Canadian writer

People in fiction
 Dr. Kildare, from a series of American films in the 1930s and 1940s, also a 1950s radio series and a 1960s television series
 Young Dr. Kildare, 1938 film starring Lew Ayres as the idealistic but somewhat immature young medical doctor
 Kildare, the fairy protagonist of the comic book Aria

Organisations
Kildare College, a secondary college for girls in Australia
Kildare County Council, the local authority for County Kildare
Kildare County F.C., a football club from Newbridge, County Kildare 
Kildare GAA, responsible for Gaelic Games in County Kildare
Kildare Senior Football Championship, competition between the top Kildare Clubs
Kildare Senior Hurling Championship, competition between the top Kildare Clubs
Kildare Catholic College, a secondary college in Australia
Kildare's Irish Pub, a popular "Irish" pub

Music 
The Killdares, an Irish band